Karampon (also known as Karampan) is a village located in Kayts, Velanai Island, off the Jaffna Peninsula, Northern Sri Lanka.

The majority of the people are Hindus along with a minority of Christians. There are a number of Hindu Temples along with a few churches. The village is also served by a dozen of schools.

External links

References

Villages in Jaffna District
Island North DS Division